Kathryn Aalto is an American landscape designer, historian, educator and New York Times Bestselling author based in Exeter, England.

Early life 
Kathryn Aalto grew up between San Francisco and the Sierras in California's San Joaquin Valley where she developed a lifelong interest in landscape history, design and literature of place. She was educated at the University of California at Berkeley, Western Washington University, the London College of Garden Design and the University of Bristol, from which she received a Bachelor's in English, a Master's in English, a Diploma in Garden Design and a Master's in Garden History.

Career

Books 
Kathryn Aalto is the author of three books including Writing Wild: Women Poets, Ramblers, and Mavericks Who Shape How We See the Natural World (2020) and The Natural World of Winnie-the-Pooh: A Walk Through the Forest that Inspired the Hundred Acre Wood, published in 2015 by Timber Press, which became a New York Times Bestseller in February 2016. It was featured on NPR's "All Things Considered" on October 26, 2015 and selected as a People magazine Best Pick in Nonfiction in November 2015. Extensive coverage of the book included an article and review in The Washington Post, articles in The Boston Globe and The Oregonian, as well as radio interviews on NPR, WAMC and MPR. She is also the author of Nature and Human Intervention about the Italian garden designer Luciano Guibbilei.

. This book appeared on New York Times bestseller list in February 2016.

Teaching and public speaking 
As an educator, she has taught American Literature of Nature and Place, Critical Thinking and Composition and other writing courses at Western Washington University, Everett Community College and Exeter College where she is an adjunct lecturer. A dynamic public speaker, Kathryn Aalto lectures widely, both in the United States and England, to libraries, schools, historical societies, botanical gardens, universities and civic clubs. Past venues have included Harvard Universities Arnold Arboretum, The New York Public Library, the Northwest Flower and Garden Show and the Virginia Festival of the Book.

References

External links 
 
 Official Timber Press page for The Natural World Of Winnie-the-Pooh: A Walk Through the Forest that Inspired the Hundred Acre Wood
 NPR Interview on Northeast Public Radio
 NPR Interview on All Things Considered.
 Debate at RHS Wisley

Living people
University of California, Berkeley alumni
Western Washington University alumni
American garden writers
People from Escalon, California
American women non-fiction writers
Year of birth missing (living people)
American expatriates in England
Alumni of the University of Bristol
21st-century American women
Writers from California